John Caldwell may refer to:

Politicians
John Caldwell (Kentucky politician) (1757–1804), Lieutenant Governor of Kentucky, 1804
John Caldwell (Michigan politician) (1849–1916), Michigan state representative, 1897–1900
John Caldwell (New South Wales politician) (1817–1884), New South Wales colonial politician
John Caldwell (Western Australian politician) (1934–2000), Western Australian state politician
John Caldwell (seigneur) (1775–1842), Early Quebec seigneur and politician

John A. Caldwell (1852–1927), U.S. Representative from Ohio
John Henry Caldwell (1826–1902), U.S. Representative from Alabama
John Lawrence Caldwell (1875–1922), American ambassador to Iran
John W. Caldwell (1837–1903), U.S. Representative from Kentucky

Military
Capt. John Caldwell, Revolutionary war soldier, died 1777, see Delaware Blue Hen
John C. Caldwell (1833–1912), General in the U.S. Army during the Civil War

Others
John Caldwell (boxer) (1938–2009), Irish Olympian, bronze medal in 1956 Olympics
John Caldwell (cartoonist) (1946–2016), American cartoonist
John Caldwell (demographer) (1928–2016), Australian demographer and member of the Order of Australia
John Caldwell (musicologist) (born 1938), British composer and Oxford University academic
John H. Caldwell (born 1928), American Nordic skier, coach and author
John Taylor Caldwell (1911–2007), Glasgow-born anarchist communist and biographer of Guy Aldred
John Tyler Caldwell (1911–1995), Chancellor of North Carolina State University
John Isaiah Caldwell (1828–?), American attorney, miner, businessman, and school trustee
John E. Caldwell (born 1950), chair of the board of Advanced Micro Devices, Inc.
John K. Caldwell (1881–1982), American diplomat
Jock Caldwell (John Caldwell, 1874–?), Scottish footballer
John Caldwell, real name of John Fenwick (Jesuit) (1628–1679), English Jesuit